Viktor Antonovych Matviyenko (9 November 1948 – 29 November 2018) was a Soviet and Ukrainian footballer and coach.

Honours
 Soviet Top League winner: 1971, 1974, 1975, 1977.
 Soviet Cup winner: 1974.
 UEFA Cup Winners' Cup winner: 1975.
 UEFA Super Cup winner: 1975.
 Olympic bronze: 1976.

International career
He earned 21 caps for the USSR national football team, and participated in UEFA Euro 1972. He also won a bronze medal in football at the 1976 Summer Olympics. He died 20 days after his 70th birthday in 2018.

References

External links
Profile 
 

1948 births
2018 deaths
Footballers from Zaporizhzhia
Ukrainian footballers
Soviet footballers
Soviet Union international footballers
Association football defenders
UEFA Euro 1972 players
Soviet Top League players
Soviet First League players
Soviet Second League players
FC Dynamo Kyiv players
FC Dnipro players
FC Metalurh Zaporizhzhia players
SC Odesa players
Olympic footballers of the Soviet Union
Footballers at the 1976 Summer Olympics
Olympic bronze medalists for the Soviet Union
Ukrainian football managers
Ukrainian Premier League managers
NK Veres Rivne managers
FC Podillya Khmelnytskyi managers
FC Torpedo Zaporizhzhia managers
CS Tiligul-Tiras Tiraspol managers
FC Bukovyna Chernivtsi managers
FC Dustlik managers
Ukrainian expatriate football managers
Expatriate football managers in Uzbekistan
Ukrainian expatriate sportspeople in Uzbekistan
Expatriate football managers in Moldova
Ukrainian expatriate sportspeople in Moldova
Olympic medalists in football
Medalists at the 1976 Summer Olympics
Burials at Baikove Cemetery